Exaeretia buvati is a moth in the family Depressariidae. It was described by Jacques Nel in 2014. It is found in Pyrénées-Orientales in France.

References

Moths described in 2014
Exaeretia
Moths of Europe